Kamaran  is an airport serving the village of Kamaran on Kamaran Island in Yemen.

The runway is not easily seen, but does have markings. A poorly defined north–south runway exists, with a reported length of

See also
Transport in Yemen

References

External links
 OurAirports - Yemen
  Great Circle Mapper - Kamaran
 Kamaran

Airports in Yemen